hr1 is the first radio station of the Hessischer Rundfunk.

History
hr1 is the successor of Radio Frankfurt, a radio program run by the American occupation government after World War II. After a formal law was issued, the radio station was transferred to the civil government on 28 January 1949.

Until 2004, hr1 was mainly an information program with news and stories. It was then turned into a general radio station playing music from the 1960s to the 1980s and aiming at an older audience. This program change was met with harsh criticism and caused the number of listeners to drop sharply. Most of the information programs were moved to other radio stations, including hr2 and hr-info.

Reception
hr1 can be received in all of Hesse and neighboring regions on FM. It is also present on the Astra 19.2°E satellite (DVB-S).

Frequencies are as follows:

Bad Hersfeld: 88.9 MHz
Biedenkopf: 91.0 MHz
Darmstadt: 90.6 MHz
Frankfurt am Main: 94.4 MHz
Fulda: 104.8 MHz
Kassel: 99.0 MHz
Kassel-City: 94.3 MHz
Michelstadt: 88.1 MHz
Wiesbaden: 98.3 MHz

References

Radio stations in Germany
Radio stations established in 1948
1948 establishments in Germany
Mass media in Frankfurt
Hessischer Rundfunk